Sir Donald William Insall  (born 7 February 1926) is a British architect, conservationist and author, who has been described as "one of the leading conservation architects of his generation". He is the founder of the architectural, conservation and architectural consultancy practice, Donald Insall Associates.

Early life
Insall was born on 7 February 1926 in Bristol, where he attended Bristol Grammar School. He served in the Coldstream Guards during the Second World War and qualified in architecture at the Royal West of England Academy School of Architecture, now part of the University of Bristol. He then studied at the Royal Academy and the School of Planning.

Career
Insall worked with the London architects, Phillimore and Jenkins.
During 1957 Insall published his report The Care of Old Buildings, marking the 80th anniversary of the founding by William Morris of the Society for the Protection of Ancient Buildings. During 1958 he founded architectural conservation practice Donald Insall Associates, and was joined shortly after by Peter Locke (1929–2013), both men having been Lethaby Scholars of the Society for the Protection of Ancient Buildings in 1950.

Insall was appointed the City of Chester's consultation consultant in 1960, a post he held until 1978.

Donald Insall Associates continues its specialist work in conservation, historic consultancy, adaptive re-use and new buildings in sensitive sites. Insall ran the practice until his retirement in 1998, and continues active as a Consultant.

Honours
In the 1995 New Year Honours Insall was appointed a Commander of the Order of the British Empire (CBE) for services to conservation. Subsequently, he was appointed a Knight Bachelor in the Queen's 2010 Birthday Honours.

In recognition of his conservation work in Chester, Insall received the honorary freedom of the City of Chester in 1999. He has also received Europa Nostra's Medal of Honour.

Insall was awarded the honorary degrees of Doctor of Laws from the University of Bristol in 2004 and Doctor of Architecture from the University of Chester in 2012.

Personal life
Insall lives on Kew Green in Kew, south west London. He and his wife Libby have two sons and one daughter. His elder son, Robert Insall, is a Professor of cell biology at the University of Glasgow and a Fellow of the Royal Society of Edinburgh.

Publications 
 The Care of Old Buildings, report (1957)
Chester: A Study in Conservation (1968) 
 The Care of Old Buildings Today: A Practical Guide (Architectural Press, 1972)
 Living Buildings: Architectural Conservation, Philosophy, Principles and Practice (Images Publishing Group Pty Ltd, 2008 and 2018)

Selected projects 
 Windsor Castle restoration following the 1992 Windsor Castle fire
 Battle of Britain Monument in London
 Palace of Westminster
 Cross Bath, Bath, Somerset, refurbished in the 1990s
 Somerset House
 Garrick's Temple to Shakespeare
 Plumpton Place
 Wotton House
 Chester Conservation Plan 
 Market Hall, Monmouth – a new flat roof for the single storey building, together with a Modernist metal and glass facade at the rear, overlooking the River Monnow, in 1968–69
 Kedleston Hall
 Kelmscott Manor
 Chevening, Kent
 Goldsmiths' Hall, London
 Mansion House, London
 Somerset House, London
 The Holme, Regents Park, London
 The Vyne, Hants
 Croft Castle, Herefordshire
 Berrington Hall, Herefordshire
 Speke Hall, Liverpool
 Trafalgar Square paving, London
 Queen Mother Memorial, The Mall, London

References

External links 
Donald Insall Associates 50th Anniversary Newsletter
Interview with Insall
Donald Insall Associates website
Bristol University Honorary Degree and profile

1926 births
Living people
Architects from Bristol
Commanders of the Order of the British Empire
Conservation architects
Knights Bachelor
People from Kew, London
Writers from Bristol
People associated with the University of Chester
People educated at Bristol Grammar School
People associated with the University of Bristol